Gorka Muravyovskaya is a rural locality (a village) in Muravyovskoye Rural Settlement of Velsky District, Arkhangelsk Oblast, Russia. The population was 1,553 as of 2014. There are 28 streets.

Geography 
Gorka Muravyovskaya is located on the Vaga River, 7 km northeast of Velsk (the district's administrative centre) by road. Petukhovskaya is the nearest rural locality.

References 

Rural localities in Velsky District